Jean-Michel André Jarre (born 24 August 1948) is a French composer, performer and music producer. He is a pioneer in the electronic, synthpop, ambient and new-age genres, and an organiser of outdoor spectacles of his music featuring lights, laser displays, and fireworks.

Jarre was raised in Lyon by his mother and grandparents, and trained on the piano. From an early age he was introduced to a variety of art forms, including those of street performers, jazz musicians, and the artist Pierre Soulages. He played guitar in a band, but his musical style was perhaps most heavily influenced by Pierre Schaeffer, a pioneer of musique concrète at the Groupe de Recherches Musicales.

His first mainstream success was the 1976 album Oxygène.  Recorded in a makeshift studio at his home, the album sold an estimated 12 million copies. Oxygène was followed in 1978 by Équinoxe, and in 1979 Jarre performed to a record-breaking audience of more than a million people at the Place de la Concorde, a record he has since broken three times.  More albums were to follow, but his 1979 concert served as a blueprint for his future performances around the world.  Several of his albums have been released to coincide with large-scale outdoor events, and he is now perhaps as well known for these performances as his albums.

Jarre has sold an estimated 80 million albums and singles.  He was the first Western musician to be allowed to perform in the People's Republic of China, and holds the world record for the largest-ever audience at an outdoor event.

Albums

Studio albums

Soundtrack albums

Live albums

Compilation albums

Remix albums

Non-album tracks
In addition to the catalogue of songs featured on his studio albums, Jarre has also recorded (or recordings exist of) over 30 songs not included on the original editions of the studio albums. These include new songs featured on compilation albums, soundtracks, live albums, single B-sides, stand-alone singles, songs featured on special edition releases of studio albums and songs performed live on TV. 
The songs featured in the table below have either been released officially, and/or have high quality recordings (video or audio) of them accessible on public access sites such as YouTube.

Singles 
This list does not include downloads or promotional singles.

Notes:
 F^ – Released in France only
 N^ – Released in NL
 U^ - Released in UK
 J^ - Released in Japan

Video albums 
 Place De La Concorde (1980, VHS PAL-G & SECAM)
 The China Concerts (1989, VHS PAL-G)
 Rendez-vous Houston: A City in Concert (1989, VHS PAL-G)
 Rendez-vous Lyon: Concert for the Pope (1989, VHS PAL-G)
 Destination Docklands (1989, VHS PAL-G)
 Images – The Best of Jean-Michel Jarre (1991, VHS NTSC)
 Paris la Defense (1992, VHS SECAM/VHS PAL-G)
 Europe in Concert (1994, VHS NTSC)
 Concert pour la Tolerance (1995, Laserdisc PAL)
 Oxygen in Moscow (1997, DVD NTSC/VHS PAL-G, released on the US and Brazil)
 Paris Live: Rendez-vous 98 Electronic Night (1998, VHS NTSC, released on Japan as part of Tetsuya "TK" Komuro's "TK 1998" boxset)
 Aero DVD (2004)
 Live in Beijing (2004, DVD PAL, 1-disc release in France only)
 Jarre in China (2005, DVD PAL, 2-disc European re-release of the above with extra features)
 Jean-Michel Jarre: Solidarnosc Live (2005, DVD NTSC; released in 1-disc and 2-disc DVD/CD versions)
 Teo & Tea DVD (2007, DVD 5.1 with the "Teo & Tea" video in high definition HD, included in the "De Luxe Edition CD")
 Oxygene in Moscow DVD (2007, including "Oxygene in Moscow 1997 concert" + bonus "The Making of Oxygene in Moscow")
 Oxygene 2D DVD (2007, available with the special edition Oxygene 2007 album)
 Oxygene 3D DVD (2007, limited edition box set which also includes 2 pairs of 3D glasses)

Music videos 
 1977: Oxygene (Part 4) (from Oxygène)
 1978: Equinoxe (Part 4) (from Équinoxe)
 1979: Equinoxe (Part 5) (from Équinoxe)
 1981: Magnetic Fields (Part 2) (from Magnetic Fields)
 1982: Orient Express (from The Concerts in China)
 1982: Souvenir Of China (from The Concerts in China)
 1984: Zoolook (from Zoolook)
 1985: Zoolookologie (from Zoolook)
 1986: Fourth Rendez-Vous (from Rendez-Vous)
 1988: Revolutions (from Revolutions)
 1989: Oxygene (Part 4) (from Jarre Live)
 1990: Calypso (from Waiting for Cousteau)
 1993: Chronologie (Part 4) (from Chronologie)
 1993: Chronologie (Part 2) (from Chronologie)
 1993: Chronologie (Part 8) (from Chronologie)
 1997: Oxygene (Part 8) (from Oxygene 7-13)
 1997: Oxygene (Part 8) (animated video) (from Oxygene 7-13)
 1997: Oxygene (Part 8) (remix) (from Oxygene 7-13)
 1997: Oxygene (Part 10) (Sash! Remix) (from Oxygene 7-13)
 1998: Rendez-Vous '98 (feat. Apollo Four Forty)
 1998: Together Now (feat. Tetsuya Komuro)
 2000: C'est La Vie (from Métamorphoses)
 2000: Tout Est Bleu (from Métamorphoses)
 2004: Aerology (from AERO)
 2007: Téo & Téa (from Téo & Téa)
 2007: Oxygene (Part 4) (Penguins) (from Oxygene: New Master Recording)
 2016: Oxygene (Part 17) (from Oxygène 3)
 2018: Robots, Don't Cry (movement 3) (from Equinoxe Infinity)

Cover version albums 
 Oxygene - The Magic of Jean-Michel Jarre (performed by Ed Starink) (1991)
 The Symphonic Jean-Michel Jarre (performed by the City of Prague Philharmonic Orchestra) (2006)
 Re-Oxygene (2007)

Books 
 Jean-Michel Jarre (1987)
 Concert D'Images (1989)
 Paris La Defense - Une Ville En Concert (1990)
 Europe in Concert (1994)
 Concert pour la Tolérance - Paris Tour Eiffel (1996)
 The Millennium Concert - At The Grand Pyramids of Egypt (2000)
 Akropolis - Elpida (2001)
 Aero - Aalborg, Denmark (2002)
 Jean-Michel Jarre à Pékin (2004)
 Photo book - Live in Gdansk (2006)
 The Making of Water for Life (Hardback book, published by idesine) (2007)

References

Further reading

External links 
Jarre.ch - Complete discography

Discographies of French artists
Pop music discographies
Electronic music discographies